Albert Childs (born 25 September 1930) is an English former footballer who played as a defender. He is currently the oldest surviving player to have represented Liverpool.

References

1930 births
English footballers
Northern Nomads F.C. players
Liverpool F.C. players
Bishop Auckland F.C. players
Living people
Association football defenders